Siem Reap Airways International was a Cambodian regional airline based in Phnom Penh, Cambodia. Wholly owned by Bangkok Airways of Thailand, its primary hub was Phnom Penh International Airport, with secondary hubs at Suvarnabhumi Airport and Siem Reap International Airport. It ceased operations in 1 December 2008.

Destinations 
Siem Reap Airways served the following destinations:

Cambodia - Phnom Penh, Siem Reap
Hong Kong
Thailand - Bangkok
Vietnam - Ho Chi Minh City
Laos - Pakse

Fleet 
In May 2008, the Siem Reap Airways fleet included the following aircraft (all operated by Bangkok Airways):

2 Airbus A320-200
1 ATR 72-500

Banned EU status 
Siem Reap Airways appeared on the European Union's list of prohibited carriers for safety reasons and is therefore banned from operating services of any kind within any EU nations. As of 1 December 2008, the airline sought clarification with the European Union about the ban.

References

External links 

Siem Reap Airways International (Archive)
Siem Reap Airways International Fleet
Siem Reap Airways
Sarika inflight magazine

Defunct airlines of Cambodia
Airlines established in 2000
Airlines disestablished in 2008
Cambodian companies established in 2000